Richard Chamberlain (7 July 1840 – 2 April 1899)  Was born in Camberwell to Joseph Chamberlain (1796-1874) and Caroline Harben (1806-1875).

He was a Liberal and later Liberal Unionist politician in the United Kingdom. 

Richard was the younger brother of Joseph Chamberlain , he was Mayor of Birmingham from 1879 to 1880, and later Member of Parliament (MP) for Islington West from 1885 to 1892. His relative Robert Francis Martineau was also a City of Birmingham alderman and a member of the Birmingham University council.

He was buried at Key Hill Cemetery, Hockley, Birmingham.

References

1840 births
1899 deaths
Richard
People from Birmingham, West Midlands
Liberal Party (UK) MPs for English constituencies
Liberal Unionist Party MPs for English constituencies
UK MPs 1885–1886
UK MPs 1886–1892
Mayors of Birmingham, West Midlands
Burials at Key Hill Cemetery